Pietrusza Wola  (Petrusha Volia) is a village in the administrative district of Gmina Wojaszówka, within Krosno County, Subcarpathian Voivodeship, in south-eastern Poland. Its approximate population is 300.

References

Pietrusza Wola